The Tri-State Tomahawks were a professional independent league baseball team that played in the Frontier League in 1993. They were located in Ashland, Kentucky, USA and played their home games at the Boyd County High School baseball field. The team was disbanded during the 1993 season.

The name Tri-State Tomahawks is derived from the geographical location of the Huntington–Ashland metropolitan area near the convergence of Ohio, Kentucky and West Virginia where the team was based.

Frontier League teams
Defunct Frontier League teams
Baseball teams disestablished in 1993
Defunct independent baseball league teams
Defunct baseball teams in Kentucky
Baseball teams established in 1993